The Pakistan Swimming Federation is the governing body of swimming in Pakistan. The Federation was formed in 1948 with its headquarters in Lahore. It has been a member of International Swimming Federation (FINA) since 1948, and was one of the founding members of the Asian Amateur Swimming Federation in 1978.

Zoraiz Lashari currently serves as the President, with Majid Waseem as the Chairman. They were elected in December 2020 on a four-year term.

Affiliations 
The federation is affiliated with:
 International Swimming Federation (FINA)
 Asian Amateur Swimming Federation
 Pakistan Sports Board
 Pakistan Olympic Association

Affiliated bodies
The following bodies are affiliated with the federation:

 Punjab Swimming Association
 Sindh Swimming Association
 Khyber Pakhtunkhwa Swimming Association
 Balochistan Swimming Association
 Islamabad (Federal Area) Swimming Association
 FATA Swimming Association
 Gilgit Baltistan Swimming Association
 Pakistan Army
 Pakistan Navy
 Pakistan Air Force
 WAPDA Sports Boards
 Higher Education Commission
 Pakistan Railway
 Pakistan Women Swimming Association
 Pakistan Aquatics Coaches Association
 Athletes Commission
 Individual members

National Championship 
The first National Swimming Championship was held in Lahore in 1951. Since then, National Championships are held annually. The swimming competitions are also a regular part of the National Games.

See also

 Pakistani swimming records

References

External links
 Official Website

National members of the Asian Swimming Federation
Sports governing bodies in Pakistan
Swimming in Pakistan
Sports organizations established in 1948
1948 establishments in Pakistan